Mad is a district of Vientiane province, Laos.

References 

Districts of Laos